The fifth generation Ford Thunderbird is a large personal luxury car that was produced by Ford for the 1967 to 1971 model years. This fifth generation saw the second major change of direction for the Thunderbird. The Thunderbird had fundamentally remained the same in concept through 1966, even though the styling had been updated twice. The debut of the Ford Mustang in early 1964 and the subsequent introduction of the larger, upmarket Mercury Cougar to challenge Chrysler motors' similarly larger, more upscale version of a pony car, the Dodge Charger, began to erode the Thunderbird's sales and forced it even larger, including four-door models.

The new 1969  Continental Mark III was based on the four-door Thunderbird chassis, and from that point until the end of 1976, Thunderbirds and Continental Marks were related cars. They would share commonality again later from 1984–1998.

History

For 1967 the Thunderbird would be a larger car, moving it closer to Lincoln as the company chose to emphasize the "luxury" part of the "personal luxury car" designation. Ford decided to abandon the Thunderbird's traditional unibody construction for this larger car, turning to a body-on-frame method with sophisticated rubber mountings between the two to improve noise/vibration characteristics and reduce weight by a small margin. An overhead console (that first appeared on the previous years Town Landau) containing illuminated indicators for emergency flasher use, low-fuel warning, door-ajar and seat-belt reminder light returned in a revised format. The listed retail price of the two-door Landau coupe was US$4,704 ($ in  dollars ).

The convertible, increasingly a slow seller, was dropped in favor of a four-door model that was 2.5 in (6.3 cm) stretched, featuring suicide doors, a signature feature of the Lincoln Continental four-door sedans of that era. It remained in the lineup through 1971 but never generated substantial sales. New for 1969, the Continental Mark III coupe was built on the same four-door chassis. 

The 1967 design was radically different from what came before. Ford's stylists delivered a radical shape that in many ways anticipated the styling trends of the next five years. A gaping wide "fishmouth" front grille that incorporated hidden headlights was the most obvious new feature. The look was clearly influenced by the air intakes on jet fighters such as the F-100 Super Sabre, and was enhanced by the flush-fitting front bumper incorporating the bottom "lip" of the "mouth". The sides were the barrel-like "fuselage" style that was very popular during this period. The belt line kicked up "coke-bottle" style after the rear windows, again a styling trait that would prove ubiquitous. Large C-pillars (and a small "formal" rear window on the 4-door) meant poor rear visibility but this was inline with the fashion of the time. The taillights spanned the full width of the car, and featured, as in previous Thunderbird models, sequential turn signals.

In contrast to the radically different exterior the new interior carried over nearly all of the themes established by the previous generation; most notably a dash panel with separately housed instruments along with a downward sweeping/integrated center console and a wraparound rear seat/"lounge".

The 1968 Thunderbird saw the introduction of the new 385 series big-block "Thunder Jet" 4V (4 barrel carburetor)  V8 engines. The new engine made the cars some of the quickest and fastest Thunderbirds ever produced, despite their larger size and increased curb weight. 1968 and 1969 model years saw minor trim changes respectively.

For the 1970 model year, the Thunderbird was stylistically updated with the addition of a large, bird's beak-style projection out of its grille. Offered in 2- or 4-door models, all 1970-1971 Thunderbirds had prominent angular lines on the hood leading to a jutting tip, that also formed the center of the grill work, that was not a too thinly disguised bird beak. Semon "Bunkie" Knudsen, a former GM executive now President of Ford, is said to be responsible for this dramatic change. As with the 1967-69 models, the 1970-71 models had sequential turn signals incorporated into the full panel tail lights at the rear of the car.

In 1971, Neiman Marcus offered "his and hers" Thunderbirds in its catalog, with telephones, tape recorders and other niceties. They retailed for US$25,000 for the pair ($ in  dollars ).

Production totals

References

005
Rear-wheel-drive vehicles
1970s cars
Coupés
Convertibles
Motor vehicles manufactured in the United States
Cars introduced in 1967
Personal luxury cars